Jean-Pierre Vidal (born 24 February 1977 in Saint-Jean-de-Maurienne, Savoie) is a French alpine skier.
As a young skier, he focused mainly on downhill. After hurting his knee, however, he decided to go for slalom. In 2002, he had his best year, winning a gold medal in the 2002 Winter Olympics and taking a World Cup win in Kranjska Gora.
A song was called after him (Slalom dans la tête) and in the French ski resort Les Sybelles, a lift was named after his gold medal as well (Médaille d'Or in La Toussuire).
After this fantastic year, it took Vidal until 2006 to return to the highest level of skiing competition. In January 2006, he won a World Cup race in Kitzbühel. Barely a month later, on February 24, 2006, he broke his forearm during a training session in Turin. He then decided to stop his professional career. At this time, the 2006 Winter Olympics were not over yet.

He is the brother of alpine skier Vanessa Vidal and the nephew of alpine skiers Jean-Noël Augert and Jean-Pierre Augert.

World Cup victories

References

External links
 Jean-Pierre Vidal's official website

1977 births
Living people
People from Saint-Jean-de-Maurienne
French male alpine skiers
Olympic alpine skiers of France
Alpine skiers at the 2002 Winter Olympics
Alpine skiers at the 2006 Winter Olympics
Olympic medalists in alpine skiing
Medalists at the 2002 Winter Olympics
Olympic gold medalists for France
Sportspeople from Savoie
Universiade gold medalists for France
Universiade bronze medalists for France
Universiade medalists in alpine skiing
Competitors at the 1999 Winter Universiade